Pranyamanithooval is a 2002 Malayalam film directed by Thulasidas starring Vineeth Kumar, Jayasurya and Gopika (in her debut). This movie is a remake of 1999 Tamil movie Nee Varuvai Ena.

Synopsis 
This movie has as its central characters, three young people - Vinod, Balu and Meera. Vinu is a young college student. Meera is Vinu's girlfriend. Their marriage was almost fixed. Then Vinu dies in an accident and his eyes were transplanted to Balu. Meera tries to see Balu to see Vinu's eyes, but Balu misunderstands and thinks that she loves him. Meera tells him the truth. His friends give him an idea to make Meera fall in love with him. They tell him to make a rumor that he is going to commit suicide by jumping off a building. While standing there, Balu accidentally falls and is admitted to the hospital. The doctor tells Meera that Balu is dead, but after they realize that he is alive,  Meera falls in love with Balu.

Cast

References

External links
 

2000s Malayalam-language films
2002 films
2002 romantic drama films
Indian teen films
Malayalam remakes of Tamil films
Films directed by Thulasidas
Films scored by Mohan Sithara